Rheem, also known as Rheem Valley and Rheem Center, is an unincorporated community in Contra Costa County, California, United States. It was incorporated into the town of Moraga when that town was incorporated in 1974.

The place was named after its developer, Donald Laird Rheem, one of the founders of Rheem Manufacturing Company and the son of William Rheem, President of Standard Oil Company.

References

Unincorporated communities in California
Unincorporated communities in Contra Costa County, California